Gabriel François Doyen (1726 – 5 June 1806) was a French painter who was born in Paris.

He became an artist against his father's wishes, becoming a pupil at the age of twelve of Charles-André van Loo. Making rapid progress, he obtained at twenty the Grand Prix de Rome, and in 1748 set out for Rome. He studied the works of Annibale Carracci, Pietro Berrettini da Cortona, Giulio Romano and Michelangelo, then visited Naples, Bologna and, crucially, Venice. While in the latter city Doyen was greatly influenced by the work of the famous colourists, such as Titian.

In 1755 returned to Paris and, at first unappreciated and disparaged, he resolved by one grand effort to achieve a reputation, and in 1758 he exhibited his Death of Virginia. It was completely successful, and procured him admission to the Académie Royale de Peinture et de Sculpture. Doyen was also influenced by Peter Paul Rubens after a visit to Antwerp. This influence is, perhaps, best displayed in his Le Miracle des ardents, painted for the church of St Genevieve at St Roch (1767). This painting was exhibited in the salon of 1767, which was recorded by Saint-Aubin in "View of the salon of 1767'". Art historian Michael Levey described this painting as the 'high point' in the artist's career, suggesting the drama of the piece may be a precursor to that which characterises the French Romantic painting of the 19th century. He notes how the writhing figures of the foreground are similar to those found in The Raft of the Medusa by Théodore Géricault. In 1773 Doyen painted his The Last Communion of St Louis for the high altar of the chapel at the École Militaire; it is strongly reminiscent of The Last Communion of St Jerome by Domenichino and displays a sharp clarity of message, required by its position far above the high altar.  Another notable work of this period in Doyen's life is the Triumph of Thetis for the chapel of the Invalides. In 1776 he was appointed professor at the Academy.

During the initial stages of the French Revolution he became active in the national museum project; however in 1791 he left France for Russia on the invitation of Catherine II of Russia. He settled in St Petersburg, where he was much honoured by the Imperial family and Russian art establishment. He died there on 5 June 1806.

References

1726 births
1806 deaths
Painters from Paris
18th-century French painters
French male painters
19th-century French painters
Prix de Rome for painting
French emigrants to the Russian Empire
19th-century French male artists
18th-century French male artists